Willy Jäggi (28 July 1906 – 1 February 1968) was a Swiss footballer who played for Switzerland in the 1934 FIFA World Cup. He also played for FC Solothurn, Servette FC, FC La Chaux-de-Fonds, Urania Genève Sport, FC Lausanne-Sport, FC Biel-Bienne and represented Switzerland at the 1928 Summer Olympics.

References

1906 births
1968 deaths
Swiss men's footballers
Switzerland international footballers
Footballers at the 1928 Summer Olympics
1934 FIFA World Cup players
Association football forwards
FC Solothurn players
Servette FC players
FC La Chaux-de-Fonds players
Urania Genève Sport players
FC Lausanne-Sport players
FC Biel-Bienne players